Fiji vs Papua New Guinea in rugby league is a rivalry between the Fiji national rugby league team and the Papua New Guinea national rugby league team in the sport of rugby league. The two sides first met in 1993, where Papua New Guinea came out as 35–24 victors. The two sides have faced each other 11 times, PNG winning seven sttye74ayeurj£7__×=&$&$*#,@,hzkakxksjduduuuuuuuxifucdugugrugrvdu

Head to Head

Results

1990s

2000s

2010s

References

External links 

 Papua New Guinea vs Fiji – Tests – Rugby League Project
 [https://www.rugbyleagueproject.org/matches/Custom/NjEtLS0tLS0tLS0tLTY1LS1uLXktLS0tLS0t Papua New Guinea vs Fiji – Internationals – Rugby League Project

Rugby league rivalries
Fiji national rugby league team
Papua New Guinea national rugby league team